is the largest regional bank in Japan, operating mainly in Kanagawa Prefecture and southwestern Tokyo. It currently operates 610 offices in Japan and five offices overseas (Shanghai, Hong Kong, Bangkok, New York and London).

History
The bank was founded in 1920 as a regional bank to serve customers in Kanagawa Prefecture and southwestern Tokyo. It was formed in the wake of the collapse of several existing banks in the region, one of which (Dai-Ni Bank) began operations in 1869 as Yokohama Bank (横浜為替会社), the first modern financial institution in Japan; consequentially, Bank of Yokohama claims to have the longest history of any Japanese bank.

In 2015, Bank of Yokohama announced a merger with the smaller Higashi-Nippon Bank to create Concordia Financial Group, the largest regional bank holding company in Japan. Upon completion of this transaction in March 2016, Bank of Yokohama was de-listed, and Concordia took its place as a constituent of the Nikkei 225 stock market index.

Group Companies
 Hamagin Tokai Tokyo Securities 
 Hamagin Research Institute
 Hamagin Finance
 Yokohama Capital
 Yokohama Guarantee
 Yokohama Staff Service
 Yokohama Operation Service
 Hamagin Mortgage Service
 Hamagin Business Operations Center
 Bankcard Service Japan

See also

 Loans in Japan

References

External links
  Wiki collection of bibliographic works on Bank of Yokohama

Regional banks of Japan
Companies based in Yokohama
Companies listed on the Tokyo Stock Exchange
Companies based in Kanagawa Prefecture
Banks established in 1920
Japanese brands
Japanese companies established in 1920